Arthur Robert Hoyle (1922 – 2 May 2012) was an Australian historian and biographer. Born in Sydney, Australia, in 1922 to Arthur Hoyle (1896–1971) and Gertrude Underwood (1895–1972), he served in the Royal Air Force as a navigator during World War II with 460 Squadron and was awarded the Distinguished Flying Cross. Hoyle returned to Australia and married Moira Peisley (1924–1998). He had four sons, Arthur Marshall Hoyle Phillip, Warwick and Andrew (dec).

He served in the Australian Public Service and later taught Administration at the University of Canberra. He held the degrees of BA (Hons) and Dip Ed (University of Sydney) and M.SocSci (University of Birmingham).

He is best known for his biographies.

He died on 2 May 2012 at Calvary Retirement Community Canberra.

Biographies
 King O'Malley: The American Bounder, A. R. Hoyle, Macmillan, Melbourne, 1981
 Roderick Flanagan: A bright flame too soon extinguished, A. R. Hoyle, SP, Canberra, 1988
 Into the Darkness: A personal memoir (Autobiography), A.R. Hoyle, SP, Canberra, 1989
 Eddie Ward: The Truest Labor Man, A. R. Hoyle, SP, Canberra, 1994
 The Life of John Hunter: Navigator, Governor, Admiral, A. R. Hoyle, Mulini Press, Canberra, 2001
 Hughie Edwards VC: The Fortunate Airman, A. R. Hoyle, Mulini Press, Canberra, 2001

Autobiography
  Into the Darkness – One Young Australian's Journey from Sydney to the deadly skies over Germany 1939–1945 by Arthur Hoyle, DFC, Edited by David Vernon, Stringybark Publishing, Canberra, 2012,

References

External links
 Hughie Edwards Review
 Bibliography at the National Library of Australia
Australian War Memorial

1922 births
Australian historians
Australian biographers
Male biographers
2012 deaths
Royal Air Force personnel of World War II
Australian expatriates in the United Kingdom